Madness are an English ska and pop band from Camden Town, North London, who formed in 1976. One of the most prominent bands of the late 1970s and early 1980s two-tone ska revival, they continue to perform with six of the seven members of their original line-up. Madness's most successful period was from 1980 to 1986, when the band's songs spent a total of 214 weeks on the UK Singles Chart. (UB40 shared the same number of weeks, the largest for any British group in the decade, but over a longer period.)

Madness have had 15 singles reach the UK top ten, including "One Step Beyond", "Baggy Trousers" and "It Must Be Love", one UK number-one single "House of Fun" and two number ones in Ireland, "House of Fun" and "Wings of a Dove". "Our House" was their biggest US hit, reaching number 7 on the Billboard Hot 100. In 2000, the band received the Ivor Novello Award from the British Academy of Songwriters, Composers and Authors for Outstanding Song Collection.

Career

1976–1978: Formation 
The core of the band formed as the North London Invaders in 1976, and included Mike Barson (Monsieur Barso) on keyboards and vocals, Chris Foreman (Chrissy Boy) on guitar and Lee Thompson (Kix) on saxophone and vocals. They later recruited John Hasler on drums and Cathal Smyth (better known as Chas Smash) on bass guitar. Later in the year, they were joined by lead vocalist Dikran Tulaine.

This six-piece line-up lasted until part-way through 1977, when Graham McPherson (better known as Suggs) took over the lead vocals after seeing the band perform in a friend's garden. Tulaine went on to be an actor under the name Dikran Tulaine. Smyth, who left after an argument with Barson, was replaced by Gavin Rodgers, Barson's girlfriend's brother. McPherson was kicked out of the band for choosing to watch Chelsea instead of rehearsing too often. Thompson left the band after Barson criticised his saxophone playing.

By 1978, the band had allowed McPherson to return as a vocalist after he had filled in temporarily for Hasler (who had taken over vocals when McPherson was removed). Thompson returned after patching things up with Barson. Drummer Dan Woodgate (Woody) and bassist Mark Bedford (Bedders) also joined the band, replacing Garry Dovey and Rodgers, respectively. After briefly changing their name to Morris and the Minors, the band renamed itself as Madness in 1979, paying homage to one of their favourite songs by ska and reggae artist Prince Buster. The band remained a sextet until late 1979 when Chas Smash rejoined and officially became the seventh member of Madness as a backing vocalist and dancer.

1979–1981: Early success
During 1979, the band began to attract a live following in London, being regulars at the Dublin Castle in Camden Town. The band's first commercial recording was the Lee Thompson composition "The Prince". The song, like the band's name, paid homage to their idol, Prince Buster. The song was released through 2 Tone Records, the label of the Specials founder and keyboardist Jerry Dammers. The song was a surprise hit, peaking in the UK music charts at number 16. Madness toured with fellow 2 Tone bands the Specials and the Selecter, before recording their debut studio album.

That debut studio album, One Step Beyond... was released by Stiff Records. The album included a re-recording of "The Prince" and its B-side "Madness", and the band's second and third singles: "One Step Beyond" and "My Girl". The title song was a cover of the B-side of the 1960s Prince Buster hit "Al Capone". The One Step Beyond... album stayed in the British charts for 78 weeks, peaking at number 2. Smyth performed on the album but was not an official member of the band at the time or the album's recording or release. He would formally join Madness a few weeks after One Step Beyond... was issued in October 1979.

After the release of "My Girl", the band felt that they had exhausted the material from One Step Beyond..., and did not want to release any more singles from the album. However, Dave Robinson, head of Stiff Records, disagreed. Eventually, a compromise was made, and the band decided to release an EP featuring one album track and three new tracks. The result was the Work Rest and Play EP, which was headlined by the song "Night Boat to Cairo", from the One Step Beyond album. The EP reached number 6 in the UK Singles Chart.

In 1980, the band's second studio album, Absolutely reached number 2 in the UK Albums Chart. Absolutely spawned some of the band's biggest hits, most notably "Baggy Trousers", which peaked at number 3 in the UK Singles Chart. "Embarrassment" reached number 4 in the charts, and the instrumental song "The Return of the Los Palmas 7" climbed to number 7. Although the album reviews were generally less enthusiastic than those of One Step Beyond..., they were mostly positive. Robert Christgau gave the album a favourable B− grade, but Rolling Stone awarded the album just one out of five stars. Rolling Stone was particularly scathing of the ska revival in general, stating that "The Specials wasn't very good" and Madness were simply "the Blues Brothers with English accents".

A drama-documentary film titled Take It or Leave It was released in 1981, featuring the band members playing themselves in a re-creation of their early days to the then-current period. Live recordings of Madness performances as well as those by other 2 Tone bands were used in the 1981 documentary film and soundtrack album Dance Craze.

1981–1983: Change of direction
In 1981, the band's third studio album, 7, reached number 5 in the UK Albums Chart and contained three hit singles: "Grey Day" (no. 4, April 1981), "Shut Up" (no. 7, September 1981), and "Cardiac Arrest" (no. 14, February 1982). In an article in 1979, Chris Foreman explained that the band's music would move with the times, and change styles as time goes on. This was shown to be the case, as unlike the two ska-filled, fast-paced albums that preceded it, 7 was something of a change in direction. Suggs' vocal performance changed significantly, and his strong accent from the previous studio albums had been watered down. The album strayed from the ska-influenced sound of One Step Beyond... and Absolutely and moved towards a pop sound; a trend that continued with subsequent studio albums.

Near the end of 1981, Madness released one of their most recognised songs: a cover of Labi Siffre's 1971 hit "It Must Be Love". The song climbed to number 4 in the UK, and in 1983, the song peaked at number 33 in the US charts. In 1982, Madness released their only number 1 hit to date, "House of Fun", which they played live on the British sitcom The Young Ones, and also reached number 1 in the album charts with their first compilation, Complete Madness (1982).

In November 1982, they released their fourth studio album, The Rise & Fall, which was well received in the UK, but did not get an American release. Instead, many of its songs were included on the US compilation Madness (1983), including "Our House", which was their most internationally successful single to date. "Our House" reached number 5 in the UK music charts and number 7 in the US charts; it was also performed live on The Young Ones. Many reviewers compared The Rise & Fall to the Kinks' The Village Green Preservation Society (1968), and it is at times retrospectively considered a concept album. The album also featured "Primrose Hill", which was more similar to the Beatles song "Strawberry Fields Forever", containing similar psychedelic imagery and a layered arrangement.

1983–1986: Decline and break-up

In 1983, their single "Wings of a Dove" peaked at number 2 in the UK charts, followed by "The Sun and the Rain" (no. 5, November 1983). Their following studio album, Keep Moving, peaked at number 6 in the UK Albums Chart, and two singles from that album reached the top 20 in the UK Singles Chart. The album received some good reviews, with Rolling Stone magazine giving the album four out of five stars, applauding the band's changing sound. This was an improvement as the last album reviewed by the magazine, Absolutely, was heavily criticised.

On 5 October 1983 the band were rehearsing and discussing a possible television series, which was being written for them by Ben Elton and Richard Curtis. Barson then informed the band that he would not be able to take part, as he was tired of the music business and wanted to spend more time with his wife. They had recently relocated to Amsterdam. Barson agreed to finish recording the album Keep Moving; he left after playing for the last time with the band at the Lyceum Ballroom on 21 December 1983. James Mackie took Barson's place appearing with Madness on the US television show Saturday Night Live on 14 April 1984. After leaving the band, Barson returned to the UK for the filming of two music videos as he had played on the tracks, "Michael Caine" and "One Better Day". He officially left the band in June 1984, following the release of "One Better Day", however finished live performance with the band in 1983, Paul Carrack took Barson's place whilst the band toured America in early 1984. The six remaining members left Stiff Records and formed their own label, Zarjazz Records, which was a sub-label of Virgin Records.

In 1985, the label released the band's sixth studio album, Mad Not Mad. Barson's usual keyboard parts were filled by an emphasis on synthesisers provided by Steve Nieve of the Attractions. In later years, frontman Suggs has described the album as a "polished turd". The album reached number 16 in the UK charts, which is the band's lowest position on the album charts to date. Despite the poor chart showing, the album was listed as number 55 in NMEs "All Time 100 Albums". The singles for the album fared even worse, with "Yesterday's Men" peaking at number 18 in the UK charts. The subsequent singles, "Uncle Sam" and "Sweetest Girl", failed to make the top 20, which was a first for Madness singles.

The band then attempted to record a new studio album, and 11 demo tracks were recorded. However, musical differences arose between the band members. The untitled album went unreleased, and in September 1986, the band announced that they were to break-up. Barson rejoined the band for a farewell single, "(Waiting For) The Ghost Train", but did not appear in the music video. The band officially broke up following the release of the single, which reached a high of number 18 in the UK. In 1988, four members of the band – Suggs, Chas Smash, Lee Thompson and Chris Foreman – continued under the name The Madness. After one self-titled studio album and two singles that failed to make the top 40, the band broke up.

1992–2003: Reunion and Our House musical
Towards the end of 1991, "It Must Be Love" was re-released and eventually reached number 6 in the UK Singles Chart in February 1992. Following that, the singles compilation album Divine Madness (1992) was released and peaked at number 1 in the album charts. Madness then announced plans for a reunion concert, Madstock!, which was held at Finsbury Park, London on 8 and 9 August of that year. The original line-up reunited, performing together for the first time since Barson left the band in 1984. Over 75,000 fans attended the weekend festival, and the dancing of the crowd caused some nearby tower blocks to shake perceptibly as they resonated with the frequency of the music.

After the Finsbury Park comeback, a live album was released, and the associated single, "The Harder They Come" (a cover of Jimmy Cliff's 1973 song) reached number 44 in the UK, with the album reaching number 22.

The band continued to reunite for annual UK Christmas season tours and held three more Madstock! festivals; in 1994, 1996 and 1998. Also in 1998, Madness returned to America for their first tour there since 1984. The live album Universal Madness was recorded at the Universal Amphitheatre in L.A. and released the following year. In 1999, Madness released their first studio album since 1986, entitled Wonderful. The album reached number 17 in the UK Albums Chart, and the lead single, "Lovestruck", gave the band their first new top 10 hit in the UK since 1983. Neither of the two subsequent singles from the album, "Johnny the Horse" and "Drip Fed Fred" (featuring Ian Dury on vocals), entered the top 40 of the UK chart.

From 28 October 2002 to 16 August 2003, a musical based on Madness songs, Our House, ran at the Cambridge Theatre in London. Madness played a role in the executive production of the show, and Suggs played a role in the production for a period, playing the central character's father. It won an Olivier Award for best new musical of 2003, and the performance was released on DVD on 1 November 2004. There was also a previous musical based on Madness songs, One Step Beyond!, written by Alan Gilbey. The musical had a brief run at the Theatre Royal Stratford East in 1993 and a run at Putney Arts Theatre, London in 2012.

2004–2010: The Dangermen and The Liberty of Norton Folgate  

In 2004, the band played a series of low-key concerts as the Dangermen, performing covers of classic reggae and ska songs. A lot of the songs were those played by the band when they were first forming, and the band performed the songs as a celebration of their 25th anniversary.

This led to the release of the cover album The Dangermen Sessions Vol. 1 in August 2005 by V2 Records. During the sessions which produced the album, in mid-2005, guitarist Chris Foreman announced his departure, citing "the petty, time consuming bollocks that goes on in the band" as his reason for leaving. The band completed the album without him, and on release, it peaked at no. 11 in the UK Albums Chart, which was the band's highest studio album chart position in 21 years. Although two singles were released, neither was a major success in the UK. The more successful of the two, "Shame & Scandal", reached number 38, but was more successful in France where it peaked at number 12. "Girl Why Don't You" did not chart and the band left the V2 record label shortly after. At this time, Kevin Burdette joined as the band's guitarist for live appearances and also appeared in the videos for both "Sorry" and "NW5" in early 2007.

The six remaining original members of Madness began working on their first original studio album in seven years.

In March 2007, the non-LP single "Sorry" was released on the band's own record label Lucky 7 Records, peaking in the UK charts at number 23. The single included a version featuring UK hip hop artists Sway DaSafo and Baby Blue.

The new Madness song "NW5" (then still titled "NW5 (I Would Give You Everything)") and a re-recorded version of "It Must Be Love" were featured in the German film Neues vom Wixxer. The two songs were released in Germany as a double A-side, and both of them were turned into music videos, which – besides members of the film's cast – featured Suggs, Chas Smash, Woody and stand-in guitarist Burdette. A re-recorded version of "NW5" was released as a single on 14 January 2008 in the UK reaching no. 24 – this recording featured original Madness guitarist Chris Foreman, who had rejoined the band in time for the 2006 Christmas tour but had not participated in the original recording of the song.

In June 2008, Madness played the majority of their new studio album The Liberty of Norton Folgate at London's Hackney Empire for three nights. The Hackney Empire performances were recorded and sold to fans on USB wristbands as they left the show. Madness played two dates in December 2008, firstly in Manchester on 18 December, and secondly a return gig to The O2 in London on the 19th.

In December 2008 the band also announced that for their thirtieth anniversary in 2009, they would be staging a fifth Madstock Festival in London's Victoria Park on 17 July, 11 years after the last Madstock concert. It was originally rumoured that the newly reformed the Specials would make an appearance after finishing their reunion tour. However, this did not occur, although original Specials keyboardist Jerry Dammers – who was not part of the reunion line-up – was announced as a support act with the Spatial AKA Orchestra shortly before the festival. Dammers supported Madness again during their 2009 Christmas tour when he opened each night with a DJ set.

Through late March and early April 2009, the band played a series of festival and separate headlining dates across Australia. The lead-up single from their latest studio album, titled "Dust Devil", was released on 11 May on Lucky 7 Records. Actors Alfie Allen and Jaime Winstone co-starred in the music video. The single charted at No. 64 on the UK Singles Chart and at No. 1 on the UK Independent charts on 17 May 2009.

The new studio  album, entitled The Liberty of Norton Folgate, was released a week later, on 18 May 2009. It charted at No. 5 in the UK Albums Chart. The band continued to play various festivals, including Pinkpop, Splendour, and Glastonbury. On 27 September 2009, the band also played a free concert on a closed-off Regent Street in association with Absolute Radio.

On 28 August, Madness played the Rock en Seine festival near Paris, on the same night where Oasis brothers Noel and Liam Gallagher engaged in a physical altercation, resulting in the break-up of the band. As Oasis cancelled their headlining slot, Madness, even though having played earlier in the evening, were asked to replace them. They accepted the invitation and both of their sets during the festival were said to have been well received.

As in previous years, the band embarked on a Christmas tour of the UK (also playing one concert in Dublin), playing at various medium-sized venues. Mark Bedford took a break from the band and was replaced by Graham Bush for the tour.

Some members of the band appeared in Catherine Tate's Nan's Christmas Carol. They first posed as carol singers, then played "Baggy Trousers" over the credits. On 18 January 2010, Madness released a fourth single, "Forever Young", from The Liberty of Norton Folgate. The single failed to chart.

During an interview with RTÉ 2fm radio host Dave Fanning on 24 May 2010, drummer Daniel Woodgate stated that the members of the band were in the final stages of preparing songs for the follow-up to The Liberty of Norton Folgate. The band hoped to be able to start recording the album later on in 2010.

In September 2010, Madness were awarded the Idol Award at the Q Awards in London. Guitarist Chris Foreman stated in his acceptance speech that Madness were recording a new album.

Madness toured the UK throughout November and December 2010 with their final show at London's Earl's Court, where they played a new song from their upcoming album. However, two concerts, in Hull and Sheffield, were cancelled due to heavy snowfall, although they were later rescheduled for 5 and 6 February 2011 respectively.

2011–2015: Oui Oui Si Si Ja Ja Da Da

In June 2011, the band performed at Meltdown Festival at the Royal Festival Hall, curated by inspiration Ray Davies of the Kinks, who also introduced the band on stage. The concert served as the premiere of three new songs – "1978", "Can't Keep a Good Thing Down" and "Death of a Rude Boy".

The summer of 2012 saw two notable performances. In June, the band performed at the Queen's Diamond Jubilee concert at Buckingham Palace. The band performed "Our House" and "It Must Be Love" from the roof of the palace with accompanying animations projected onto the palace front. In August, the band was the first to perform at the closing ceremony of the London Olympic Games. Departed bassist Bedford rejoined the band for both performances. In August 2012, Madness released "Death of a Rude Boy" as a free teaser track from their new studio album. Madness' tenth studio album Oui Oui, Si Si, Ja Ja, Da Da was released on 29 October 2012 and entered the UK Albums Chart at no.10. In January 2013 the album re-entered the chart at no. 16 on the back of the airplay success of the single "Never Knew Your Name".

From the start of 2013, Bedford increased his performances with the band building to his full-time return to the group, which meant a close to the four years Graham Bush had spent with the band.

On 22 March 2013, the band performed outside the BBC Television Centre in a live broadcast for BBC Four. This was followed by Goodbye Television Centre, a celebration of 50 years of the television centre, marking the closure of the building and the last show to be broadcast from it. Following that the band was the closing act to the new year celebration of 2014 in Dublin, Ireland.

On 22 March 2014, Suggs confirmed that Madness were writing a new studio album which he stated "the band plan to record in the summer and release by the end of 2014".

In October 2014, Cathal Smyth, aka Chas Smash, left Madness to pursue a solo career. His debut solo studio album, A Comfortable Man, was released on 11 May 2015 by Phoenix Rising Recording Co. Although Smyth's departure was characterized at the time as a 'break' to concentrate on his solo career and not necessarily a permanent departure, Smyth has not rejoined Madness in the years since the break was announced. Madness has continued as a six-piece.

In February 2015, the band announced the Grandslam tour, taking in 20 outdoor venues.

2016–present: Can't Touch Us Now
The band announced their new studio album Can't Touch Us Now in May 2016. In support of the album, the band played the Pyramid Stage at the Glastonbury Festival in June. Lead single "Mr. Apples" was accompanied by a scripted video (first one since 2009) and A-listed by BBC Radio 2. The song "Herbert" was released as a taster accompanied by an animation video. Further singles "Can't Touch Us Now" and "Another Version of Me" were also playlisted by BBC Radio 2. The album itself entered the UK Albums Chart at number 5 in November 2016. The band finished the year on a UK arena tour in December.

Throughout 2017, the band played at several festivals and concerts worldwide including mainland Europe, Asia, and Australia.  In April their first Australian gig at the Fremantle Arts Centre in Western Australia sold out, necessitating a second gig the following night.  In August, the band hosted their own "House of Common Festival" for the second year on Clapham Common. This was the band's only London gig of the year.

In 2018, the band embarked on a summer tour of stately homes in the UK before a Christmas arena tour in December. Madness performed on New Year's Eve through to New Year's Day at "Madness Rocks Big Ben Live". The entire performance was shown on BBC One before and after that year's fireworks.

In March 2019, Madness announced the release of their group autobiography, Before We Was We: Madness by Madness, to be released on hardback that October. The book includes commentary from all seven members telling the story of their early days and childhoods up until their breakthrough as a group. In May 2021, the book was adapted as a three-part TV documentary on AMC, with the first part free on BT's YouTube channel.

The band celebrated 40 years since their debut studio album release with several special live appearances throughout 2019. The band performed at their own "House of Common" festival in August and held a special concert with a full orchestra at Kenwood House. In November they played at Electric Ballroom in Camden; forty years to the day since one of their first appearances there. The performance was broadcast on Sky Arts in 2020. The band saw the year out with three concerts at The Roundhouse.

In December 2019, the band released a new single, "Bullingdon Boys (Don't Get Bullied by the Bully Boys)". The NME described the song as a 'barbed swipe at Boris Johnson and his Eton cohorts'.

In April 2021, following some special videos created during the COVID-19 pandemic, Madness announced their first global live stream, titled "The Get Up!", to be held the next month. It featured live music and comedy from the group and Charlie Higson, pre-recorded at the London Palladium. During the live stream, the band was accompanied by Roland Gift of Fine Young Cannibals and Paul Weller of the Jam and had a cameo by Queen Elizabeth II, played by Mike Barson. They announced their 2021 tour, The Ladykillers Tour, the next day, to be held alongside Squeeze.

Spinoff acts

The Fink Brothers
The Fink Brothers were a short-lived alter ego created by Madness members Suggs and Chas Smash, working under the aliases Angel and Ratty Fink, using characters from the science fiction comic 2000 AD.

Single

The Madness

The Madness was a line-up of Madness without bassist Mark Bedford, drummer Daniel Woodgate and keyboardist Mike Barson, active between 1988 and 1989. Formed by Suggs, Chas Smash, Lee Thompson and Chris Foreman in 1988, they distinguished this line-up from the previous Madness line-up only by adding the word "The" to the band's name. The band had held a competition to find a new name on BBC Radio 1. They decided on 'The Wasp Factory' after the Iain Banks novel of the same name, but that name had already been taken by another band.

The album is notable for featuring guest performers including the Specials' Jerry Dammers, early Madness member John Hasler and Earl Falconer of UB40. It is also the first studio album produced by the band themselves under the alias 'The Three Eyes'.

The Guinness Book of British Hit Singles and many online discographies consider this band to be the same as "Madness". Several of the songs on the album ("4BF", "Be Good Boy", "Gabriels Horn", "In Wonder") were reworked songs from the cancelled 1986 Madness studio album and had been performed live or demoed in 1986 before the band broke up. Lee Thompson and Chris Foreman also alluded to this view on their sole studio album Crunch! (1990), which was dedicated to "the good ship Madness and all who sailed in her (1979 to 1989)".

Studio album
 1988: The Madness

Singles

The Nutty Boys
The Nutty Boys were Lee Thompson and Chris Foreman of Madness. The name "The Nutty Boys" was actually the name of their studio album, while the new band was called "Crunch!". The posters for their first concert mistakenly listed the band as "The Nutty Boys" instead of "Crunch!", and the name stuck. While the members of the band Madness were nicknamed "The Nutty Boys" as a whole, this section lists only the work released by Thompson and Foreman under "The Nutty Boys" name in the early 1990s.

Single

Studio album
 1990: Crunch!

Crunch!
Crunch! were also Lee Thompson and Chris Foreman. At this point, the band formally corrected the earlier mistake and officially adopted their original name of "Crunch".

Single

Collaborations
Madness collaborated with Elvis Costello in 1983 on a version of their song "Tomorrow's (Just Another Day)". It was released as a bonus track to the 12" copy of the single. In later years, Barson stated that Costello's "Watching the Detectives" was the main influence on the song "My Girl". For Wonderful in 1999, Ian Dury laid down vocals on the track "Drip Fed Fred" which was released as the last single from the album. It was Dury's last recording before his death. Ill health prevented Dury from actively promoting the single, although he did appear on the National Lottery Show, for a later performance on TFI Friday, the song was reworked to incorporate Phill Jupitus on vocals. Live, Madness have collaborated with artists including UB40 and Prince Buster, notably at their first Madstock concert. They have also played live frequently with members of the other 2 Tone bands including the Specials. In May 2008, Suggs and Carl performed live with Pet Shop Boys at London's Heaven collaborating on a new arrangement of "My Girl", as part of a tribute evening to their former minder Dainton 'The Bear' Connell, called Can You Bear It?. A few days afterwards, Pet Shop Boys posted their own version of the track on their official website.

In late 2010, the band collaborated in the Cage Against the Machine project, in which numerous artists performed John Cage's 4′33″ for a charity single intended to prevent the winner of The X Factor claiming the Christmas Number 1. The title refers to the previous year's successful campaign to get Rage Against the Machine's "Killing in the Name" to chart above X Factor winner Joe McElderry.

Lyrical themes
Frequent themes in Madness' songs included childhood memories (e.g., "Baggy Trousers", and "Our House") and petty crime (e.g., "Shut Up", and "Deceives the Eye"). Although Madness were seen by some as somewhat of a humorous band with catchy, bouncy songs, many of their songs took a darker tone (such as the singles "Grey Day" and "Tomorrow's (Just Another Day)") and they sometimes tackled what were, at the time, controversial issues in their lyrics. "Embarrassment" (from the Absolutely album) was written by Lee Thompson, and reflected the unfolding turmoil following the news that his teenage sister had become pregnant and was carrying a black man's child. Madness discussed animal testing in the song "Tomorrow's Dream". The band criticised the National Health Service (NHS) in "Mrs. Hutchinson", which told the story of a woman who, after several misdiagnoses and mistreatment, became terminally ill. The story was based on the experiences of Mike Barson's mother. Madness' final single prior to disbanding, "(Waiting For) The Ghost Train", commented on apartheid in South Africa.

Awards
The band's first notable musical award came in 1983 when Chris Foreman and Cathal Smyth won an Ivor Novello Award for Best Song for the international hit "Our House". Madness received another Ivor Novello Award 17 years later for an "Outstanding Song Collection". In 2005, they were awarded the Mojo "Hall of Fame" Award, notably for being "an artist's artist". In 2007, a campaign took place by fans of Madness for the band to be awarded a Brit Award. Many fans and critics feel they have been overlooked over their past 30 years in the music industry. In July 2009, Madness were awarded the 'Silver Clef' Icon Award. In September 2010, Madness were awarded the 'Idol Award' at the 2010 Q Awards in London.

Members
Members of the classic line-up are listed in bold.

Current members
 Chris Foreman – guitar (1976–1986, 1992–2005, 2006–present)
 Mike Barson – keyboards, piano, backing vocals (1976–1984, 1992–present)
 Lee Thompson – saxophone, percussion, vocals (1976–1977, 1978–1986, 1992–present)
 Graham "Suggs" McPherson – vocals (1977, 1978–1986, 1992–present)
 Dan Woodgate – drums, percussion (1978–1986, 1992–present)
 Mark Bedford — bass (1978–1986, 1992–2009, 2012, 2013-present)

Former members
Cathal "Chas Smash" Smyth – bass (1976–1977), vocals, trumpet, dancing (1979–1986, 1992–2014)

Touring members and regular guests
 Dick Cuthell – French horn, flugel horn, cornet (1983–1985) (live and studio) 
 Nick Parker – violin (1983) (live) 
 Jonathan Kahan – violin (1983) (live) 
 Suzanne Rosenfeld – viola (1983) (live) 
 Caroline Verney – cello (1983) (live) 
 Paul Carrack – keyboards (1984) (live) 
 James Mackie – keyboards (1984) (live) 
 Steve Nieve – keyboards (1985, 1988) (live and studio) 
 Terry Disley – keyboards (1985–1986) (live) 
 Seamus Beaghan – keyboards (1985–1986, 2009, 2012, 2021) (live and studio)  
 Jimmy Helms – backing vocals (1985–1986) (live and studio)  
 Jimmy Thomas – backing vocals (1985–1986) (live and studio)  
 Lorenza Johnson – backing vocals (1985–1986) (live) 
 Bosco De Oliveira – percussion (1985–1986) (live)    
 Norman Watt-Roy – bass (1995–1996) (live) 
 Mike Kearsey – trombone (1999, 2004, 2005–present) (live and studio)  
 Terry Edwards – saxophone, trumpet (2003) (live)  
 Steve Turner – saxophone (2003, 2005—c. 2016) (live and studio)  
 John "Segs" Jennings – guitar (2005) (live and studio) 
 Kevin Burdett – guitar (2005–2006, 2013) (live and studio) 
 Graham Bush – bass (2005, 2009–2013) (live and studio) 
 Joe Auckland – trumpet (2005–present) (live and studio)  
 Steve Hamilton – saxophone (2011–2012, c. 2016–present) (live and studio) 
 Paul Fisher – trombone (2016–2017) (live) 
 Mez Clough – percussion (2016–present) (live and studio), drums (2017, 2021) (live) 
 Neil Waters – trumpet (2017–2019) (live)
 Paul Burton – trombone (2019) (live)

Members of North London Invaders only (band changed name to "Madness" in 1979)
 John Hasler – drums (1976–1977), vocals (1976–1977, 1977–1978)
 Dikran Tulaine – vocals (1976)
 Gavin Rodgers – bass (1977–1978)
 Garry Dovey – drums (1977–1978)

Timeline

Discography

 One Step Beyond... (1979)
 Absolutely (1980)
 7 (1981)
 The Rise & Fall (1982)
 Keep Moving (1984)
 Mad Not Mad (1985)
 The Madness (1988)
 Wonderful (1999)
 The Dangermen Sessions Vol. 1 (2005)
 The Liberty of Norton Folgate (2009)
 Oui Oui, Si Si, Ja Ja, Da Da (2012)
 Can't Touch Us Now (2016)

Tours

 Two Tone Tour (1979)
 Absolutely Tour (1980)
 Seven Tour (1981)
 Complete Madness Tour (1982)
 Rise and Fall Tour (1983)
 Keep Moving Tour (1984)
 Mad Not Mad Tour (1985)
 Christmas Madness (1992)
 The Man in the Mad Suit (1993)
 Mad Dogs (1995)
 The Maddest Show on Earth (1999)
 Welcome to the Wonderful World of Madness (2003)
 To the Edge of the Universe & Beyond (2006)
 On Board the Nutty Express (2007)
 The Liberty of Norton Folgate (2009)
 Do Not Adjust Your Nut (2010)
 House of Fun Weekender (2011)
 Charge of the Mad Brigade (2012)
 Oui Oui, Si Si, Ja Ja, Da Da (2013)
 All for the M.A.D.H.E.A.D. (2014)
 Grandslam Madness (2015)
 Can't Touch Us Now (2016)
 Stately Madness (2018)
 The Sound of Madness (2018)
 Madness XL (2018–2019)
 The Ladykillers Tour (2021)
 The Great European Roadtrip (2022 - 2023)
 Madness in America (2023)

References

External links

MIS Online, fan based website since 1999
Guardian interview

 
Musical groups established in 1976
Musical groups disestablished in 1986
Musical groups reestablished in 1992
Musical groups from the London Borough of Camden
Second-wave ska groups
English new wave musical groups
Ivor Novello Award winners
2 Tone Records artists
Stiff Records artists
V2 Records artists
Yep Roc Records artists
English ska musical groups
1976 establishments in England
Articles which contain graphical timelines
Suggs (singer)
Second British Invasion artists
Zarjazz